Marine Wing Support Squadron 472 (MWSS-472) is a reserve aviation ground support unit of the United States Marine Corps. The Headquarters Element of MWSS 472 (-) is located at Joint Base McGuire-Dix-Lakehurst, New Jersey. In addition to serving as the squadron headquarters, it is also the primary site for all of the Airfield Operations specific Military Occupational Specialties (MOSs). Communications MOS's are also located at the Squadron (-) location. MWSS 472 Detachment A is located at Wyoming, Pennsylvania and serves as the squadron's primary site for motor transport operations and maintenance, as well as food service. Detachment B is located at Westover Air Reserve Base in Chicopee, Massachusetts and serves as the squadron's primary engineer services Site. The squadron falls under the command of Marine Aircraft Group 49 and the 4th Marine Aircraft Wing.

Mission
Provide all essential Aviation Ground Support requirements to a designated fixed-wing or rotary-wing component of an Aviation Combat Element (ACE) and all supporting or attached elements of the Marine Air Control Group.

History
MWSS-472 was activated and deployed in the summer of 2004 to Iraq's Al-Anbar province in support of Operation Iraqi Freedom II. The unit returned to CONUS in the winter of 2005 and deactivated the following summer. In 2009, the unit was again mobilized and sent to the same area of Iraq for its second combat deployment, until its return to CONUS in the early winter of 2010.

See also

 United States Marine Corps Aviation
 Organization of the United States Marine Corps
 List of United States Marine Corps aviation support units

Notes

References
This article incorporates text in the public domain from the United States Marines Corps.

External links
MWSS-472's official website

, Massachusetts

Chicopee
Military units and formations in Pennsylvania
4th Marine Aircraft Wing
MWSS472